Hapton may refer to:

 Hapton, Lancashire, England
 Hapton, Norfolk, England